Tenabo (Yucatec Maya: "place where they measure by hand-spans") is one of the 11 municipalities in the Mexican state of Campeche. It is situated on the coast in the north of the state. The municipal seat, and largest settlement, is the city of Tenabo, 36 km from state capital Campeche, Camp. As of 2015, the municipality had a total population of 10,665.

History and geography

The municipality of Tenabo borders to the north with Hecelchakán Municipality, to the east with Hopelchén Municipality, to the south with Campeche Municipality, and to the west with the Gulf of Mexico.

It covers 882 km2, accounting for 1.5% of the state's total surface area.

Demographics

As of 2010, the municipality had a total population of 9,736.

As of 2010, the city of Tenabo had a population of 7,543. Other than the city of Tenabo, the municipality had 90 localities, none of which had a population over 1,000.

References

Link to tables of population data from Census of 2005 INEGI: Instituto Nacional de Estadística, Geografía e Informática
Tenabo Enciclopedia de los Municipios de México

External links
Ayuntamiento de Tenabo Official website 

Municipalities of Campeche